Jo In-byeok (1330  1393), was a warrior in the Late Goryeo dynasty who came from the Hanyang Jo clan. He was the husband of Princess Jeonghwa who was the sister of the founder of the Joseon dynasty, Yi Seonggye, who granted him the title Internal Prince Yongwon when the dynasty was established.

Biography

Early life and family background
Jo Inbyeok was born into the Hanyang Jo clan in 1330 as one of the son of Jo-Don (조돈) and his wife, Lady Yi (부인 이씨) who was the daughter of Yi Hong-bok (이홍복) from the Ganseong Yi clan. He had 3 younger brothers: Jo Ingyeong (조인경), Jo Ingyu (조인규), and Jo Inok (조인옥).

His ancestors came from Goryeo as an indigenous group who settled in Yongjin-hyeon (용진현, 龍津縣). His great-grandfather, Jo Hwi (조휘) was conspired with Takcheong (탁청, 卓靑) people from Jeongju and revolt in Ssangseong (쌍성, 雙城) in 1258 during King Gojong's reign. After reached the north of Hwaju (화주, 和州) and surrender to Yuan, the position of Ssangseong General Government Office (쌍성총관부) was established, Takcheong peoples were appointed and was hereditary from generation to generation.

Military career
In 1361 (10th years reign of King Gongmin), when Hong Geon-jeok (홍건적) invaded Goryeo, Jo along with Byeon An-yeol (변안열) and others were made their own contributions.

In 1363, he also contributed to subjugate Gim Yong's Rebellion (김용의 난).

In 1372, Hobaldo (호발도, 胡拔都), Janghaema (장해마, 張海馬), and others came to attacked Yiseong (이성, 泥城) and Ganggye (강계, 江界), Jo went out as a judge and subjugated the enemy in Gaju (가주, 家州). Then, when the Japans plundered Hamju (함주, 咸州) and Bukcheongju (북청주, 北靑州), he marched out with ambushed the soldiers for defeated the Japanese and beheaded at least 70 people. From this achievement, he was worshiped as a Bongikdaebu (봉익대부, 奉翊大夫).

Reign of King Chang
After King U was expelled to Ganghwa Island, his son, Wang Chang, ascended the throne. Around 1388, it was believed that U's birthday was in Dodang (도당, 都堂), so Jo was sent alongside Gu Seong-ro (구성로) to Ganghwa in order to presented clothes for him. 

When U was in Ganghwa, he was immediately moved to Yeoheung-gun (여흥군, 驪興郡) led by Jo, Ji Yong-gi (지용기), U Hong-su (우홍수), Yu-Jun (유준). Not long after that, Chang was dethroned and killed alongside his father due to the words that he was not pure from Wang clan, but were came from Sin Don.

Reign of King Gongyang
In 1389 (1st year reign of King Gongyang), Jo was promoted into the position of Panuideokbusa (판의덕부사, 判懿德府事) in Gyeongjin. However, when he was rewarded Nok-hun (녹훈) for his service to the country, he was believed to already deceased.

Later life
After the new Joseon dynasty was established, Byeon An-yeol (변안열), Wang An-deok (왕안덕), Ji Yong-gi (지용기), Yi Won-gye (이원계), Jeong Ji (정지) and Choe Gong-cheol (최공철) all became the second rank of "Gongsin".

Family
Father: Jo-Don (조돈, 趙暾; 1308–1380)
Grandfather: Jo Yang-gi (조양기, 趙良琪; b. 1269); son of Jo-Hwi (조휘, 趙暉).
Mother: Lady, of the Ganseong Yi clan (부인 간성이씨, 1309–1379)
Grandfather: Yi Hong-bok (이홍복, 李洪福)
Younger brother(s):
Jo In-gyeong (조인경, 趙仁瓊; d. 1422)
Jo In-gyu (조인규, 趙仁珪)
Jo In-ok (조인옥, 趙仁沃; 1347–1396)
Wives and Children(s):
Lady, of the Hadong Jeong clan (부인 하동정씨)
1st son: Jo-On, Internal Prince Hancheon (조온 한천부원군, 趙溫 漢川府院君; 1347–1417)
Lady, of the Jeonju Yi clan (부인 전주이씨)
2nd son: Jo-Yeon, Internal Prince Hanpyeong (조연 한평부원군, 趙涓 漢平府院君; 1374–1429)
3rd son: Jo-Hu (조후, 趙候; 1377–1444)
4th son: Jo-Sa (조사, 趙師; d. 1432)
5th son: Jo-Bu (조부, 趙傅)
1st daughter: Lady Jo (부인 조씨) – married Hwang Gil-won (황길원, 黃吉源).
2nd daughter: Lady Jo (부인 조씨) – married Im Maeng-yang (임맹양, 林孟陽; d. 1388), nephew of Im Gyeon-mi (임견미, 林堅味; d. 1388).

References

External links
Jo In-byeok on Encykorea .
Jo In-byeok on Doosan Encyclopedia .

14th-century Korean people
Year of birth unknown
Date of birth unknown
Year of death unknown
Date of death unknown